

516001–516100 

|-bgcolor=#f2f2f2
| colspan=4 align=center | 
|}

516101–516200 

|-bgcolor=#f2f2f2
| colspan=4 align=center | 
|}

516201–516300 

|-bgcolor=#f2f2f2
| colspan=4 align=center | 
|}

516301–516400 

|-bgcolor=#f2f2f2
| colspan=4 align=center | 
|}

516401–516500 

|-bgcolor=#f2f2f2
| colspan=4 align=center | 
|}

516501–516600 

|-id=560
| 516560 Annapolisroyal ||  || The town of Annapolis Royal, Nova Scotia, is recognized as the cradle of the Canadian nation for its prominent role in the country's early origins and remains influential as a leader in heritage stewardship and preservation. || 
|}

516601–516700 

|-bgcolor=#f2f2f2
| colspan=4 align=center | 
|}

516701–516800 

|-bgcolor=#f2f2f2
| colspan=4 align=center | 
|}

516801–516900 

|-bgcolor=#f2f2f2
| colspan=4 align=center | 
|}

516901–517000 

|-bgcolor=#f2f2f2
| colspan=4 align=center | 
|}

References 

516001-517000